Nicolás Juan Coronel (born 17 October 1991, Barcelona) is a Spanish-born Argentine rugby union player.
His usual position is as a Centre and he currently plays for Lazio in Top10, after the experience with Rovigo Delta.  

From 2014 to 2015 Coronel was named in the Argentina Sevens squad for World Rugby Sevens Series.

References 

It's Rugby France Profile
Ultimate Rugby Profile

1991 births
Living people
Spanish rugby union players
Rugby union centres
Rugby Rovigo Delta players
S.S. Lazio Rugby 1927 players